There appear to be two Jnanasutras, with different Tibetan orthographies for their names. 

The first, flourished from the 5th-6th centuries. According to Dzogchen legends, he was an early Dzogchen practitioner of Vajrayāna Buddhism and a disciple of Sri Singha. This Jnanasutra was a spiritual brother of Vimalamitra, another principal disciple of Sri Singha.

According to Tarthang Tulku (1980), the second Jnanasutra was the principal lotsawa of the 8th-9th century of the first wave of translations from Sanskrit to Tibetan.

See also
Menngagde

Texts
Madhyamākalaṃkāra

References

Indian scholars of Buddhism
6th-century Indian philosophers
Madhyamaka scholars
Dzogchen lamas
Nyingma lamas
History of Pakistan
Tibetan Buddhist yogis
Translators to Tibetan
Translators from Sanskrit